Lin Li (born May 4, 1970) is an Olympic champion and former World Record holding swimmer from China. She swam for China at the:
Olympics: 1988, 1992, 1996
World Championships: 1991
Asian Games: 1990, 1994
Pan Pacific Championships: 1989, 1991

At the 1992 Olympics, she set a World Record in winning the women's 200 IM in 2:11.65, as well as also garnering silver medals in 200m breaststroke and 400m IM.

As of 2018, she currently coaches at Saratoga Star Aquatics-Live in Saratoga, California and has adjusted her last name from "Lin" to "Lynn".

References

External links

1970 births
Living people
Chinese female backstroke swimmers
Swimmers from Jiangsu
Chinese female medley swimmers
Olympic gold medalists for China
Olympic swimmers of China
Sportspeople from Nantong
Swimmers at the 1988 Summer Olympics
Swimmers at the 1992 Summer Olympics
Swimmers at the 1996 Summer Olympics
World record setters in swimming
Olympic bronze medalists in swimming
Chinese female breaststroke swimmers
World Aquatics Championships medalists in swimming
Asian Games medalists in swimming
Swimmers at the 1990 Asian Games
Swimmers at the 1994 Asian Games
Medalists at the 1996 Summer Olympics
Medalists at the 1992 Summer Olympics
Olympic bronze medalists for China
Olympic silver medalists for China
Olympic gold medalists in swimming
Olympic silver medalists in swimming
Universiade medalists in swimming
Asian Games gold medalists for China
Asian Games silver medalists for China
Medalists at the 1990 Asian Games
Medalists at the 1994 Asian Games

Nanjing Sport Institute alumni
Universiade gold medalists for China
Universiade silver medalists for China
Medalists at the 1991 Summer Universiade